Andrew Bruce Currey (born 7 February 1971 in Wee Waa, New South Wales) is a retired javelin thrower from Australia, who was the nation's leading javelin specialist in the 1990s. His main rival was training partner Adrian Hatcher.

Currey represented his native country twice at the Summer Olympics, starting in 1996. He won a total number of nine Australian titles in the men's javelin throw. He is married to Louise McPaul.

Seasonal bests by year
1993 - 80.12
1995 - 81.54
1996 - 77.28
1997 - 79.64
1998 - 85.75
1999 - 83.88
2000 - 85.28
2001 - 86.67
2002 - 85.69
2003 - 82.29
2004 - 72.94

Achievements

References
 Profile
 sports-reference

1971 births
Living people
Australian male javelin throwers
Athletes (track and field) at the 1996 Summer Olympics
Athletes (track and field) at the 2000 Summer Olympics
Athletes (track and field) at the 1994 Commonwealth Games
Athletes (track and field) at the 1998 Commonwealth Games
Athletes (track and field) at the 2002 Commonwealth Games
Olympic athletes of Australia
Sportsmen from New South Wales
Australian Institute of Sport track and field athletes
Goodwill Games medalists in athletics
Competitors at the 1998 Goodwill Games
Commonwealth Games competitors for Australia